The Las Cahobas Formation is a geologic formation in Haiti. It preserves fossils dating back to the Middle to Late Miocene period.

See also 

 List of fossiliferous stratigraphic units in Haiti

References

Further reading 
 J. Butterlin. 1960. Géologie générale et régionale de la République D'Haiti. Travaux et Mémoires de L'Institute des Hautes Estudes de L'Amérique Latine 6

Geologic formations of the Caribbean
Geology of Haiti
Neogene Caribbean
Neogene North America